Mathnet is a segment on the children's television show Square One Television that follows the adventures of pairs of police mathematicians. It is a pastiche of Dragnet.

Premise
Mathnet is a pastiche of Dragnet, in which the main characters are mathematicians who use their mathematical skills to solve various crimes and mysteries in the city, usually thefts, burglaries, frauds, and kidnappings. Each segment of the series aired on one episode of Square One, a production of the Children's Television Workshop (CTW) aimed at teaching math skills to young viewers. Five segments made up an episode (one for each weekday), with suspense building at the end of each segment.

Characters
 Kate Monday (Beverly Leech) - A pastiche of Jack Webb's Dragnet character Joe Friday, Kate usually does not show her emotions when on the job and tackles almost every situation with a calm and rational mind. She appears in the first three seasons.
 George Frankly (Joe Howard) - The partner of Kate Monday (and later Pat Tuesday), George takes his job seriously but is frequently prone to fits of comical mishaps and immature reactions. He appears in all five seasons. He has a wife named Martha whom he often mentions but who is never seen or heard.
 Pat Tuesday (Toni DiBuono) - George's second partner, appearing in Seasons 4 and 5 to replace Kate. Like Kate, Pat shares the deadpan mannerisms and no-nonsense attitude of Joe Friday.

Los Angeles cast
 Thad Green (James Earl Jones) - The Chief of the Los Angeles Police Department. He briefly appears in Season 4.
 Debbie Williams (Mary Watson) - Technical analyst at the LAPD division where Kate and George works, she is frequently called upon to process data obtained during Mathnet investigations.

New York City cast
 Joe Greco (Emilio Del Pozo) - Captain of the New York City precinct, he is the man who George, Kate, and later Pat report to when they move to New York City starting in Season 3.
 Benny Pill (Bari K. Willerford) - An undercover NYPD officer, he is Mathnet's semi-regular backup support.

Guest stars
A number of well-known actors and actresses made guest appearances on this show. Among them were:

Bob Arbogast
Julie Bennett
Betty Buckley
Maddie Corman
Paul Dooley
Jonathan Freeman
Andre Gower
Tammy Grimes
Estelle Harris
Billie Hayes
John Michael Higgins
Russell Johnson
Henry Jones
James Karen
Wayne Knight
Al Lewis
Geoffrey Lewis
Kenneth Mars
Kevin McCarthy
Eve McVeagh
Jayne Meadows
Lara Jill Miller
Melba Moore
John Moschitta Jr.
Ron O'Neal
Rex Reed
Jack Riley
Dick Sargent
Ronnie Schell
Madge Sinclair
Yeardley Smith
Arnold Stang
McLean Stevenson
Guy Stockwell
Nedra Volz
Marcia Wallace
Dick Wilson
William Windom
Edward Winter
"Weird Al" Yankovic

In addition, real-life LAPD officers Sam Salazar and Steve Fellman have also appeared as themselves, as did head writers David D. Connell and Jim Thurman as various characters.

Math and science
Real principles of math and science and mathematical tools used by the detectives to solve crimes include:
 Alphanumerics ("The Case of the Unnatural")
 Fibonacci sequence and modular arithmetic (see also Pisano period) ("The Case of the Willing Parrot")
 Kinematics ("The Problem of the Missing Baseball")
 Chromatic scale ("The Problem of the Passing Parade")
 Displacement of fluids ("The Problem of the Trojan Hamburger")
 Hamiltonian path ("The Case of the Smart Dummy")
 Process of elimination ("The Case of the Great Car Robbery", "The View from the Rear Terrace")
 Number patterns ("The Case of the Missing Air")
 Bar charts and line charts ("The Case of the Purloined Policies", "The Case of the Great Car Robbery")
 Triangulation ("The Case of the Map With a Gap")

Development and production
After a successful first season, production began on six new episodes for the second season. By the time production ended on the third season and its six episodes in 1989, Beverly Leech (Kate Monday) left, and was replaced by a new character named Pat Tuesday, played by Toni DiBuono. Production on the first six episodes with the new character commenced in 1990, and ended in 1991, in time for Square One TV's fourth season. Production on the final season and its five episodes began taping in 1991, and the last episode aired in 1992.

During production, the background music also changed. Originally, it had a synth score. Gradually, as the series progressed, it was replaced with an orchestral score.

The exterior shots of the Los Angeles police station were filmed at the former LAPD Highland Park Police Station, which had closed in 1983. It now houses the Los Angeles Police Museum and is located at 6045 York Boulevard.

The exterior shots of the New York City police station for seasons 3 and 4 were filmed at the Alexander Hamilton U.S. Custom House in Lower Manhattan. It now houses the George Gustav Heye Center of the National Museum of the American Indian and is located at 1 Bowling Green. Exterior shots for the fifth and final season were filmed at the Brooklyn Borough Hall.

Logo and motto

The Mathnet logo is a pastiche of the Los Angeles city seal. The symbols representing the city were replaced with mathematics iconography. The founding date is the year the pilot episode was filmed.

The Mathnet motto "to cogitate and to solve" is a pastiche of the LAPD motto "to protect and to serve."

At the conclusion of each episode, a title screen displays the Mathnet logo and motto against a blue background. The logo and motto were also featured on the doors of the police cars used in the Los Angeles episodes, mimicking the appearance of actual LAPD police cars.

Despite having their origins in Los Angeles, the show continued to use the logo and motto even after the setting of the show moved to New York City.

Home media and syndication

In 1991, GPN released five episodes from the first two seasons on VHS ("The Problem of the Missing Baseball", "The Trial of George Frankly", "The Problem of the Dirty Money", "The Case of the Missing Air", and "The View from the Rear Terrace").

Around the same time, select PBS stations combined parts of an episode to air in primetime. This was done primarily for seasons 3-5 (New York City era), although at least one omnibus from the Leech era was also broadcast. These versions were re-edited so that they would come in at just under an hour long, featured other segments from Square One TV as "commercials", and newly created end credits, among other differences. Two of the primetime airings were also commercially released as VHS tapes from Republic Pictures in 1992 ("Despair in Monterey Bay" and "The Case of the Unnatural").

Both Mathnet and Square One went off the air in 1994 (it was rerun until then after the final 1992 season was completed), reappearing from 1999 to 2003 on the cable television network Noggin, a joint venture of Nickelodeon and CTW. However, only 65 episodes were leased by the Noggin network. Mathnet segments also aired on Phred on Your Head Show (one of Noggin's original programs).

Other media
A Mathnet comic briefly appeared in 3-2-1 Contact magazine.

Six Mathnet books, based on episodes of the show, were published:

 Casebook 1: The Case of the Unnatural (based on Season 4, Episode 1)
 Casebook 2: Despair in Monterey Bay (based on Season 4, Episode 2)
 Casebook 3: The Case of the Willing Parrot (based on Season 2, Episode 1)
 Casebook 4: The Map With a Gap (based on Season 2, Episode 6)
 Casebook 5: The Case of the Mystery Weekend (based on Season 5, Episode 1)
 Casebook 6: The Case of the Smart Dummy (based on Season 5, Episode 6)

Episodes

Season 1 (1987)
All episodes this season were directed by Charles S. Dubin.

Season 2 (1988)

Season 3 (1990)

Season 4 (1991)

Season 5 (1992)

References

External links 
Mathnet - To Cogitate and to Solve (episode guide, photos, sound clips, and actor bios)

Square One Television
Dragnet (franchise)
Mathematics education television series
American children's education television series
1990s American parody television series
Fictional portrayals of the Los Angeles Police Department
Fictional portrayals of the New York City Police Department
Television shows set in Los Angeles
Television shows set in New York City
1987 American television series debuts
Television series by Sesame Workshop
1980s American children's television series
1990s American children's television series
1992 American television series endings